Roger Burgoyne may refer to:

Sir Roger Burgoyne, 2nd Baronet (1618– 1677) MP for Bedfordshire
Sir Roger Burgoyne, 4th Baronet (d 1716), of the Burgoyne baronets
Sir Roger Burgoyne, 6th Baronet (1710–1780), Member of Parliament for Bedfordshire 1734-47

See also
Burgoyne (surname)